François Montmaneix (June 4, 1938 in Lyon – October 21, 2018 in Lyon) was a French poet and writer.

Biography 
François Montmaneix was for many years an important player in Lyon's cultural life, directing the Maurice-Ravel auditorium, where he created the Artrium, an exhibition gallery, and Le Rectangle, center of art, place Bellecour.

Publications 
2015:  Saisons profondes, La rumeur libre Éditions
2015:  Œuvres poétiques, tomes 1 et 2, Postface by Jean-Yves Debreuille, La rumeur libre Éditions
2012: Laisser verdure, Préface d'Yves Bonnefoy, Le Castor Astral, Prix Théophile-Gautier 2013 of the Académie française 
2008: L'Abîme horizontal, Éditions La Différence, Prix Alain Bosquet 2008
2005: Jours de nuit, Éditions Le Cherche Midi
2002: Les Rôles invisibles, Le Cherche Midi, prix Guillaume Apollinaire 2003 
1997: Vivants, Le Cherche Midi, Prix AU.TR.ES 1997 (authors, translators, essayists) Prix Rhône-Alpes de Littérature
1990: L'Autre versant du feu, Éditions Belfond, Prix Louise-Labé 1991
1985: Visage de l'eau, Belfond, Prix RTL/Poésie1 1987
1980: Le Livre des ruines, Belfond
1974: Le Dé, Guy Chambelland éditeur
1970: L'Ocre de l'air, Guy Chambelland
1967: L'Arbre intérieur, Guy Chambelland

Other works
1977: Landstriche (lithographs by Hans-Martin Erhardt), Manus-Presse, Stuttgart
1995: Lyon, de place en place (photographs by Agathe Bay), Éditions Les Sillons du temps
2009: Huit heures dans un endroit où je suis né (lithographs by ), Éditions Stéphane Bachès

References

External links 
 François Montmaneix on La Rumeur libre
 François Montmaneix on Babelio
 François Montmaneix on cipMarseille
 François Montmaneix on the site of the Académie française

1938 births
2018 deaths
20th-century French poets
Prix Guillaume Apollinaire winners
Writers from Lyon